Gangammagudi is a village located in SR Puram Mandalam of Chittoor district, Andhra Pradesh, India. The name of the village is derived from a famous local temple located in the village dedicated to Goddess Gangamma. It is a 40 min. drive from Chittoor.

Economy 
The major source of economy of the village is from Agriculture with Sugarcane, Rice, Mango and Ground nut being the major crops grown throughout the year.

References 

 http://www.gangammagudi.blogspot.com - Story about the Goddess Gangamma
 http://www.gloriousindia.com/unleashed/place.php? - panchayats in S R Puram mandal
 https://www.scribd.com/doc/30064030/Consistuencies-Mandal-Wise#
 http://www.censusindia.gov.in/PopulationFinder/View_Village_Population.aspx?pcaid=520479&category=VILLAGE

Villages in Chittoor district